Becerril de la Sierra is a municipality of the autonomous community of Madrid in central Spain.

Bus

 690: Guadarrama - Collado Mediano - Navacerrada

 691: Madrid (Moncloa) - Becerril - Navacerrada - Vadesquí

 696: Collado Villalba (hospital) - Navacerrada

 724: El Boalo - Manzanares el Real - Colmenar Viejo - Madrid (Plaza de Castilla) (Only the services that come from El Boalo, and only on the way back to Madrid, not on the way to El Boalo)

References

External links 

Municipalities in the Community of Madrid